Khan Sahib is a compound of khan (leader) and sahib (master) - was a formal title of respect and honour, which was conferred mainly on Muslim, but also to Parsi, Irani, and Jewish subjects of the British Indian Empire. It was a title one degree lower than Khan Bahadur, but higher than that of Khan.

The title was conferred along with a Title Badge and a citation (or sanad) and the recipient was entitled to prefix the title to his name. The title was conferred on behalf of the British Indian Government by the Viceroy and Governor-General of India.

The title "Khan Sahib" was originally conferred by the Mughal Empire on Muslim subjects in recognition of public services rendered and was adopted by the British Indian Empire for the same purpose. Hindu subjects of the British Indian Empire were conferred the title of "Rai Sahib". Since there were no separate titles for Parsi and Jewish subjects, the British Indian Empire conferred the Muslim title of Khan Sahib to Parsi and Jewish subjects as well.

The chronological list of recipients below is not exhaustive.
 1904 Khan Sahib Karmally Joosab for personal distinction.
 1912, Ismail Merathi, Indian poet and educationist, was given the title for his literary and educational services.
 1914, Khan Sahib Syed Ahmad Dehlvi, the author of Farhang e Asifiya.
 1925, Khan Sahib M. K. Khader Pillay, Municipal President of Alwaye, Madras Presidency
 1930,Khan Sahib Musharraf Hossain, Inspector of Schools, Dacca Division, of Kashba Majail, Pangsha, Faridpur.
 1931, Chaudhry Niaz Ali Khan of Jamalpur for public service spanning 30 years by the 32nd Viceroy and Governor-General of India, Freeman Freeman-Thomas, 1st Marquess of Willingdon 
 1934, Mir Afzal Khan, Deputy Superintendent of Police, for meritorious police services awarded by the 22nd Viceroy and Governor-General of India, The Earl of Willingdon

Colonel Khan Muhammad Khan from Poonch, Azad Kashmir, Pakistan was given the Khan Sahib title for his commitment and selfless service to the people of Kashmir on 11 June 1942 by Viceroy & Governor-General of India on behalf of the British Government.
 Aziz al-Hasan Ghouri
 Khan Shaib Md Yousuf Uddin Sarker, of Burirhat, Taragonj, Rangpur, Bangladesh was awarded with ‘Khan Sahib’ title in the year 1947 by Viceroy and Governor General of India on behalf of British Government for his commitment and selfless extraordinary service for controlling a Hindu-Muslim riot in the area Alampur, Kursha, Harial kuthi, Ikorchali, Soyar, Radhanagor in Taraganj of Rangpur Bangladesh and thereby saving many lives.

See also
Sardar Bahadur
Dewan Bahadur
Khan Bahadur
Rai Bahadur
Rai Sahib
Rao Sahib
Title Badge (India)

References

Indian court titles
Titles in India
Titles in Pakistan
Titles in Bangladesh
Jews and Judaism in India
Jews and Judaism in Pakistan
Parsi people
Islam in India
Islam in Bangladesh
Islam in Pakistan